Linus Morin (born January 30, 1987 in Uppsala) is a Swedish ice hockey player. 
He is currently playing with the IK Oskarshamn in the HockeyAllsvenskan. 
He has played with the Brynäs IF in the Elitserien.

References

External links

1987 births
Living people
Sportspeople from Uppsala
Brynäs IF players
IK Oskarshamn players
Swedish ice hockey defencemen